Proshki is a village in Verkhnyadzvinsk Raion, Vitebsk Region, Belarus. The village is the northernmost settlement in the country.

References

Villages in Belarus
Populated places in Vitebsk Region